Euryphymus is the type genus of grasshoppers in the subfamily Euryphyminae, erected by Carl Stål in 1873 as a subgenus of "Calliptenus" (Euryphymus).  Species have been recorded from southern Africa and Madagascar (although the known distribution may be incomplete).

Species 
A key to most species was given by Uvarov.  The Orthoptera Species File includes:
 Euryphymus eremobioides Bolívar, 1889
 Euryphymus exemptus (Walker, 1870)
 Euryphymus haematopus (Linnaeus, 1758) - type species (as Gryllus haematopus Linnaeus, by subsequent designation)
 Euryphymus kalahariensis Barker, 1985
 Euryphymus tuberculatus Martínez y Fernández-Castillo, 1898
 Euryphymus xanthocnemis Brancsik, 1897

References

External links 
 Images at Inaturalist and of E. haematopus at OSF
 

Caelifera genera
Acrididae
Orthoptera of Africa